Lac Polaris (Pourvoirie Mirage Inc) Water Aerodrome  is located near Trans-Taiga Road on Lake Polaris and serves Mirage Lodge Quebec, Canada.

See also
 Pourvoirie Mirage Aerodrome

References

Registered aerodromes in Nord-du-Québec
Seaplane bases in Quebec